Luis Ramón Estay Saavedra (22 July 1938 – 3 November 2013), known as Ramón Estay, was a Chilean football manager and footballer.

Career
Born in Iquique, as a football forward, he played for Club Deportivo Cavancha and the team of Iquique. At professional level, he played for Audax Italiano, Magallanes and Deportes Concepción.

As a football manager, he was mainly related to his hometown club, Deportes Iquique, since he was involved in its foundation and coached it in seven stints, winning the 1979 Segunda División de Chile and the 1980 Copa Polla Gol.

In Chile, he also coached Magallanes, Deportes Arica and Regional Atacama. 

In Peru, where he came recommended by his former assistant Miguel Ángel Arrué, he coached Ciclista Lima from 1993 to 1995, winning the 1993 Segunda División as Defensor Kiwi-Ciclista Lima, Alianza Lima in 1994, Deportivo Municipal in 1995 and Melgar in 1996. As a fact, he became the second Chilean to manage Melgar after José Tadormina. Then, he moved to Ecuador and led Deportivo Quito, reaching the runner-up in the 1997 Ecuadorian Serie A.

Personal life
His sons Luis Ramón Jr., the elder, and José Orlando, were professional footballers who played for Deportes Iquique at the end of the 1980s.

In Peru, he was nicknamed Chompita (Little Sweater) and Chompita Ploma (Grey Little Sweater), due to the fact that he used to wear that article of clothing.

He was honored as Hijo Ilustre (Illustrious Son) of Iquique.

Estay died due to an respiratory insufficiency in the Hospital of Iquique.

Honours

Manager
Deportes Iquique
 Segunda División de Chile: 1979
 Copa Polla Gol: 1980

Defensor Kiwi-Ciclista Lima
 Segunda División de Perú: 1993

Universidad Arturo Prat
 : 2006, 2007, 2008

Legacy
After Estay passed away, the municipal stadium of Iquique was renamed Estadio Tierra de Campeones Ramón Estay Saavedra.

In 2020 season, the alternative shirt of Deportes Iquique was designed in honor of Estay and Club Deportivo Cavancha.

References

External links
 

1938 births
2013 deaths
People from Iquique
Chilean footballers
Audax Italiano footballers
Deportes Magallanes footballers
Deportes Concepción (Chile) footballers
Magallanes footballers
Chilean Primera División players
Primera B de Chile players
Chilean football managers
Chilean expatriate football managers
Magallanes managers
San Marcos de Arica managers
Deportes Iquique managers
Club Alianza Lima managers
Deportivo Municipal managers
FBC Melgar managers
S.D. Quito managers
Primera B de Chile managers
Chilean Primera División managers
Chilean expatriate sportspeople in Peru
Chilean expatriate sportspeople in Ecuador
Expatriate football managers in Peru
Expatriate football managers in Ecuador